Mark Conway (born 20 May 1973) is a former Australian rules footballer who played with Port Adelaide in the Australian Football League (AFL).

Conway, a tall forward, topped Central District's goal-kicking in 1996, with 57 goals.

When Port Adelaide formed a squad for their inaugural AFL season, Conway was picked up from Central District as a zone selection, along with teammates Jarrod Cotton, Stuart Dew and Nathan Steinberner. He played just one senior AFL game for Port Adelaide, which was in round 14 of the 1997 season, against Hawthorn at Waverley Park. The 24-year-old had five disposals.

He was a member of the Sturt team which won the 2002 SANFL premiership, over his former club Central District.

References

1973 births
Australian rules footballers from South Australia
Port Adelaide Football Club players
Port Adelaide Football Club players (all competitions)
Central District Football Club players
Sturt Football Club players
Living people